FK Atletas Kaunas (former:LKKA ir Teledema) was a Lithuanian football club from the city of Kaunas. The majority of the players was recruited from the Lithuanian Academy of Physical Education. LKKA ir Teledema earned promotion to the A Lyga, Lithuania's top football division, for the 2009 season after FBK Kaunas and Atlantas Klaipėda voluntarily withdrew their participation. The team played in the A Lyga for the first time in the club's history.

Players

References

Defunct football clubs in Lithuania
2013 disestablishments in Lithuania
Association football clubs disestablished in 2013
2005 establishments in Lithuania